Shaun Whiteside (born 1959) is a Northern Irish translator of French, Dutch, German, and Italian literature. He has translated many novels, including Manituana and Altai by Wu Ming, The Weekend by Bernhard Schlink, Serotonin by Michel Houellebecq, and Magdalene the Sinner by Lilian Faschinger, which won him the Schlegel-Tieck Prize for German Translation in 1997. Since May 2021, he has served as the president of the European Council of Literary Translators' Associations.

Life

Whiteside was born in County Tyrone in Northern Ireland in 1959. He graduated with a First in Modern Languages at King's College, Cambridge. After he finished his studies, he worked as a business journalist and television producer before translating full-time. As he said in a brief interview, "Did I always want to be a translator? I certainly wanted to do something that involved travel and languages, but even when my work in television took me to far-off places, I kept coming back to translation, first for fun, and eventually as a way of earning a living." Whiteside is the former Chair of the Translators Association of the Society of Authors. He currently lives in London with his wife and son, where he sits on the PEN Writers in Translation committee, the editorial board of New Books in German, and the Advisory Panel of the British Centre for Literary Translation, where he regularly teaches at the summer school. He has stated that he would like to "have a go at Uwe Tellkamp's Der Turm (The Tower), a massive great project but a worthwhile one."

Selection of translated titles

 The Wall by Marlen Haushofer, 1990
 Lenin's Brain by Tilman Spengler, 1993
 The Birth of Tragedy by Friedrich Nietzsche, 1993
 Magdalene the Sinner by Lilian Faschinger, 1997, winner of the Schlegel-Tieck Prize
 The Confusions of Young Törless by Robert Musil, 2001
 Let Me Go by Helga Schneider, 2001 
 Payback by Gert Ledig, 2002
 Auschwitz: A History by Sybille Steinbacher, 2004 
 Mourning, Murder and Melancholia by Sigmund Freud, 2005
 The Bonfire of Berlin: A Lost Childhood in Wartime Germany by Helga Schneider, 2005
 Manituana by Wu Ming, 2009
 Altai by Wu Ming, 2013
 Swansong 1945: A Collective Diary of the Last Days of the Third Reich by Walter Kempowski, 2015
 Melnitz by Charles Lewinsky, 2015
 The Giraffe's Neck by Judith Schalansky, 2015, commended for the Schlegel-Tieck Prize
 Malacqua: Four Days of Rain in the City of Naples, Waiting for the Occurrence of an Extraordinary Event by Nicola Pugliese, 2017
 To Die in Spring by Ralf Rothmann, 2017
 Serotonin by Michel Houellebecq, 2019
 Time of the Magicians: Wittgenstein, Benjamin, Cassirer, Heidegger, and the Decade That Reinvented Philosophy by Wolfram Eilenberger, 2020

External links
 Article and review by Whiteside for The Independent
 Interview with Whiteside by British Centre for Literary Translation (YouTube)
 Description of Altai at Verso Books
 Description of Manituana at Verso Books
 Description of The Wall at Cleis Press

References

Irish translators
Dutch–English translators
French–English translators
German–English translators
Italian–English translators
Translators of Sigmund Freud
1959 births
Living people
Literary translators
20th-century translators
21st-century translators
Translators of Friedrich Nietzsche